Ottawa University (OU) is a private Baptist university with its main campus in Ottawa, Kansas, a second residential campus in Surprise, Arizona, and adult campuses in the Kansas City, Phoenix and Milwaukee metropolitan areas. It was founded in 1865 and is affiliated with the Ottawa Tribe of Oklahoma and the American Baptist Churches USA. The residential campus in Ottawa has a student enrollment of more than 850 students, while the OUAZ campus in Surprise boasts more than 900. In total, Ottawa University serves more than 4,000 students across all of its campuses and online.

History
The origins of Ottawa University date back to the 1860s when Baptist missionaries established the First Baptist Church in the area that would eventually develop into Ottawa, which at the time was occupied by Native Americans. Elsewhere, Kansas Baptists had managed to charter an institute of higher learning that they were planning on calling the "Roger Williams University" after Roger Williams, the founder of the First Baptist Church in America. In the early 1860s, they were looking for a place to establish it and at the 1860 Baptist State Convention in Atchison, Kansas, Rev. John Tecumseh "Tauy" Jones made a case for the university coming to Ottawa; he proposed that the Baptists work with the Native Americans in the area, who had land that they might be willing to sell for the purpose of creating a college.

After discussions with the Native Americanswho were amenable to the ideait was agreed that 20,000 acres of land would be set aside for the express purpose of constructing a college. On August 20, 1862, the first board of trustees (made up of four Native Americans and two white Baptists) met and decided to purchase 5,000 acres of the aforementioned land so as to establish a campus. In 1865, the name "Roger Williams University" was decommissioned and "Ottawa University" was adopted. Eventually, the campus was whittled down to about 640 acres. Rev. Isaac Smith Kalloch, a Baptist minister from New England, served as the first president from 1866 to 1868 and oversaw the construction of Tauy Jones Hall, the oldest surviving building on campus.

Campuses

The original campus, founded in 1865, is in Ottawa, Kansas. It is referred to as OU.

A second residential campus opened in 2017 in Surprise, Arizona, and is referred to as OUAZ.

In addition to the residential locations, OU has adult campuses in Overland Park, Kansas; and Brookfield, Wisconsin.

Affiliation
It is affiliated with the American Baptist Churches USA. 

Ottawa University is accredited by the Higher Learning Commission. Its education programs in Kansas are accredited by the National Council for the Accreditation of Teacher Education and approved by the Kansas State Department of Education.

Academics
Ottawa University offers bachelor's degree programs in more than 25 disciplines. Current graduate program offerings include Master of Accountancy, Master of Business Administration (MBA), Master of Arts in Education (MAEd), Master of Arts in Human Resources (MAHR), Master of Arts in Counseling (MAC), Master of Arts in Leadership, Master of Science in Addiction Counseling, and Master of Science in Nursing (MSN).

In 2017, U.S. News & World Report ranked the school as the 3rd-highest regional private college in Kansas; the site also ranked Ottawa University as 42 out of 150 in a ranking of Midwest Regional Colleges.

Research and cultural resources
Ottawa University is the Alpha chapter of Pi Kappa Delta, the national speech and debate honorary. In 1913, Ottawa became the founding member and continues to invest in forensic activities over 100 years later.

Free and open to the Ottawa, Kansas, and surrounding communities, the music department holds a number of concerts throughout the year both on campus and in local venues. The theatre department offers a variety of productions for the community. The University serves as a host for community related events throughout the year.

Athletics

Kansas Braves

The athletic teams of the Kansas (main) campus are called the Braves. The university is a member of the National Association of Intercollegiate Athletics (NAIA), primarily competing in the Kansas Collegiate Athletic Conference (KCAC) since the 1982–83 academic year; which they were a member on a previous stint from their charter member days in 1902–03 to 1970–71. The Braves previously competed as a founding member of the Heart of America Athletic Conference (HAAC) from its inception in 1971–72 to 1981–82.

Ottawa competes in 31 intercollegiate varsity athletic teams: Men's sports include baseball, basketball, bowling, cross country, football, golf, lacrosse, powerlifting, soccer, tennis, track & field, volleyball and wrestling; while women's sports include basketball, beach volleyball, bowling, cross country, flag football, golf, lacrosse, powerlifting, soccer, softball, stunt, tennis, track & field, volleyball and wrestling; and co-ed sports include competitive cheer, competitive dance and eSports. Also OU offers varied intramural programs.

Arizona Spirit
The athletic teams of the Arizona (OUAZ) campus are called the Spirit. The campus is a member of the National Association of Intercollegiate Athletics (NAIA), primarily competing in the Golden State Athletic Conference (GSAC) since the 2018–19 academic year; while its football team competes in the Sooner Athletic Conference (SAC) since the 2018 fall season. They are also a member of the National Christian College Athletic Association (NCCAA), primarily competing as an independent in the West Region of the Division I level.

OUAZ competes in 27 intercollegiate varsity sports: Men's sports include baseball, basketball, cross country, football, golf, soccer, swimming & diving, tennis, track & field, volleyball, water polo and weightlifting; while women's sports include basketball, beach volleyball, cross country, golf, soccer, softball, stunt, swimming & diving, tennis, track & field, volleyball, water polo and weightlifting; and co-ed sports include competitive cheer and competitive dance.

Student life
The campus in Ottawa, Kansas, offers more than 30 student groups, clubs and organizations, including the oldest student-run newspaper in Kansas, The Campus. The school offers drama, music, fraternities and sororities, honor societies, campus ministry opportunities, and other activities.

The campus in Surprise offers music ensembles, academic and professional clubs, campus ministries, and club teams such as bowling, lacrosse and outdoor adventures.

Notable people
Faculty
 Irene Rima Makaryk, distinguished professor

Alumni
 Wayne Angell, former Federal Reserve governor, Kansas State Representative and Bear Stearns chief economist
 Mitch Barnhart, Athletic Director, University of Kentucky
 Leonard Erickson, researcher of DNA repair
 Howard K. Gloyd, herpetologist, credited with describing several new species of reptiles
 Robin Harris, comedian
 Marvin Harvey, basketball coach
 Timon Marshall, Arena Football League player
 Merritt C. Mechem, territorial Supreme Court justice and one-term Republican governor of New Mexico
 Dorothy C. Stratton, director of the United States Coast Guard Women's Reserve (SPARS) during World War II
 DeDe Dorsey, National Football League (Indianapolis Colts (2006-Super Bowl XLI Champions) and Detroit Lions)
 Derrick Ward, National Football League (played football for Ottawa University for one semester, and did not graduate from this institution)
 Mary Watson Weaver, composer

References

External links
 
 Ottawa Braves athletics website
 Ottawa–Arizona Spirit athletics website

 
Education in Franklin County, Kansas
Universities and colleges affiliated with the American Baptist Churches USA
Educational institutions established in 1865
Buildings and structures in Ottawa, Kansas
Private universities and colleges in Kansas
1865 establishments in Kansas